Karl Renner (14 December 1870 – 31 December 1950) was an Austrian politician and jurist of the Social Democratic Workers' Party of Austria. He is often referred to as the "Father of the Republic" because he led the first government of German-Austria and the First Austrian Republic in 1919 and 1920, and was once again decisive in establishing the present Second Republic after the fall of Nazi Germany in 1945, becoming its first President after World War II (and fourth overall).

Early life
Renner was born the 18th child of an  ethnic German family of poor wine-growers in Unter-Tannowitz (present-day Dolní Dunajovice in the Czech Republic), then part of the Margraviate of Moravia, a crown land of the Austro-Hungarian Empire. Because of his intelligence, he was allowed to attend a selective gymnasium in nearby Nikolsburg (Mikulov), where one of his teachers was Wilhelm Jerusalem. From 1890 to 1896 he studied law at the University of Vienna. In 1895 he was one of the founding members of the Friends of Nature organisation and created their logo.

Political career
In 1896 he joined the Social Democratic Workers' Party of Austria (SDAP), representing the party in the National Council from the 1907 elections until its dissolution in November 1918. During this period he founded and edited the party's journal, Der Kampf, together with Otto Bauer and Adolf Braun. Renner's interest in politics also led him to become a librarian for the Reichsrat. During these early years, he developed new perspectives on law — all the while cloaking his innovative ideas under a variety of pseudonyms (for example, Synopticus and Rudolf Springer) lest he lose his coveted post as parliamentary librarian. He was especially interested in the problems of the Austrian state, whose existence he justified on geographical, economic and political grounds. On the nationality question, he upheld the so-called “personal autonomy” on the basis of which the super-national state should develop, and thereby influenced the agenda and tactics of the Social Democratic Party in dealing with it. As a theorist he was reckoned as one of the leaders of Austro-Marxism.

First Republic
In 1918, after the collapse of the Austro-Hungarian Empire, he was in the forefront of the Provisional and the Constitutional National Assemblies of those Cisleithanian "Lands Represented in the Reichsrat" (the formal description of the Austrian half of the Dual Monarchy) that predominantly spoke German and had decided to form a nation-state like the other nationalities had done. Renner became the first head of government ("State Chancellor") of that newly established small German-speaking republic which refused to be considered the heir of the Habsburg monarchy and wished to be known as the Republic of German-Austria. This name, however, was prohibited by The Entente. They also vetoed a resolution of the Constituent National Assembly in Vienna that "German-Austria" was to be part of the German Weimar Republic. Even before the collapse of the Austro-Hungarian Monarchy, Renner had proposed a future union of the German parts of Austria with Germany, even using the word "Anschluss". Like other Austrian socialists, Renner believed that the best course was to seek union with Germany.

He was the leader of the delegation that represented this new German-Austria in the negotiations of St. Germain where the "Republic of Austria" was acknowledged but was declared to be the responsible successor to Imperial Austria. There Renner had to accept that this new Austria was prohibited any political association with Germany and he had to accept the loss of German-speaking South Tyrol and the German-speaking parts of Bohemia and Moravia where he himself was born; this  forced him to give up his share in the parental farm if he, "the peasant proprietor who turned Marxist", wanted to remain an Austrian government officer.

Renner was Chancellor of Austria of the first three coalition cabinets from 1918 until 1920 and at the same time Minister of Foreign Affairs, backed by a grand coalition of Social Democrats and Christian Social Party. A wide range of social reforms were introduced by Renner's government, including unemployment insurance, paid holidays, the eight-hour workday, and regulations on the working conditions of miners, bakers, women, and children.  State aid was also provided for the disabled, together with health insurance for public employees. In addition, a law was passed that provided for collective bargaining and the mediation of disputes.

From 1931 to 1933, Renner was President of Parliament, the National Council of Austria. After the dictatorial Austrofascism period from 1934, when his party was prohibited, he even welcomed the Anschluss in 1938. Having originally been a proponent of new German-Austria becoming a part of the democratic German Republic, he expected Nazism to be but a passing phenomenon not worse than the dictatorship of Dollfuss's and Schuschnigg's authoritarian one-party system. During World War II, however, he distanced himself from politics completely.

Relationship with Nazism and Communism 
On 2 April 1938, Renner appealed to Austrians to vote yes in the 10 April plebiscite that legitimized the Anschluss; many Austrians followed his advice, and as a result, Austrians welcomed the Germans and Hitler himself. After the Anschluss, Renner offered to serve in the Nazi government during the occupation, but was declined. During the occupation, according to official Austrian figures, 51,500 Austrian Jews out of a total of 200,000 died in concentration camps, which, as documented during the Nuremberg war-crimes trials, had a disproportionately large number of Austrian guards.

On 29 March 1945, Soviet commander Fyodor Tolbukhin's troops crossed the former Austrian border at Klostermarienberg in Burgenland. On 3 April, at the beginning of the Vienna Offensive, Renner, then living in southern Lower Austria, established contact with the Soviets. Joseph Stalin had already established a would-be future Austrian cabinet from the country's communists in exile, but Tolbukhin's telegram changed Stalin's mind in favor of Renner.

On 20 April 1945, the Soviets, without asking their Western allies, instructed Renner to form a provisional government. Seven days later Renner's cabinet took office, declared the independence of Austria from Nazi Germany and called for the creation of a democratic state along the lines of the First Austrian Republic. Soviet acceptance of Renner was not an isolated episode; their officers re-established district administrations and appointed local mayors, frequently following the advice of the locals, even before the battle was over.

Renner and his ministers were guarded and watched by NKVD bodyguards. One-third of State Chancellor Renner's cabinet, including the crucial seats of the Secretary of State of the Interior and the Secretary of State for Education, was staffed by Austrian Communists. The Western allies suspected the establishment of a puppet state and did not recognize Renner. The British were particularly hostile, and even American President Harry S. Truman, who believed that Renner was a trustworthy politician rather than a token front for the Kremlin, denied him recognition. However, Renner had secured multi-party control of the government by designating two Under-Secretaries of State in each of the ministries, appointed by the two parties not designating the Secretary of State.

Historian Harold Green commented: "But for Renner's having gained Soviet support for creating a Social Democratic Austrian Republic - and his establishing it at record speed after the Nazi collapse - Austria might have shared Germany's post-war fate and spent several decades divided into a Communist East Austria and a Democratic West Austria, with Vienna as a divided city like Berlin."

Post–World War II
Renner's government opted to restore the 1920 Constitution, as amended in 1929. However, following elections that November, the Federal Assembly temporarily suspended the provision calling for the president to be popularly elected, and elected Renner as president on 20 November. 

Karl Renner died in 1950 in Vienna and was buried in the Presidential Tomb at the Zentralfriedhof.

Anti-Semitism 
Anti-Semitism was widespread in Austria after the First World War and even after the Second World War, even in the highest government offices. Karl Renner, whom Emperor Karl I rejected as prime minister, stood out before and after the war due to vehement anti-Semitism. Even after the Nazi terror against Jewish returnees and survivors of the concentration camp. Marko Feingold, survivor of the concentration camp and president of the Salzburg Jewish Community, said in 2013: "Karl Renner, after all the first Federal President of the Second Republic, had long been known in the party as an anti-Semite. He didn't want us concentration campers in Vienna after the war and he also frankly said that Austria would not give anything back to them."

Political beliefs and scholarly contributions

For most of his life, Renner alternated between the political commitment of a social democrat and the analytical distance of an academic scholar. Central to Renner's academic work is the problem of the relationship between private law and private property. With his  [The Institutions of Private Law and their Social Functions] (1904), he became one of the founders of the discipline of the sociology of law. In this book, Renner developed a Marxist theory of the institution of private law. Renner argued that the separation of public and private law is a creation of capitalism, whereby the state enforces the interests of capital owners.

His and Otto Bauer's ideas about the legal protection of cultural minorities were taken up by the Jewish Bund, but fiercely denounced by Vladimir Lenin. Joseph Stalin devoted a whole chapter to criticising Cultural National Autonomy in Marxism and the National Question.

The 1977–1978 academic year at the College of Europe was named in his honour.

Publications
 Synopticus (pen name),  (Vienna, 1899).  Reprinted as “State and Nation” in Ephraim Nimni (ed.), National Cultural Autonomy and Its Contemporary Critics,  London: Routledge, 2005 pp. 64 – 82 
 Rudolf Springer (pen name),  (1902)
 , (“Foundations and development goals of the Austro-Hungarian monarchy: the crisis of dualism”; 1904)
  (“Austria's renewal”; 3 vols., 1916/17)
  (1918)
  (“The economy as an integrated process and the path to socialism”; 1924)
  (“The national economy, the world economy and socialism”; 1929)
  (1929); translated into English by A. Schwarzschild as The Institutions of Private Law and their Social Function, with an introduction by Otto Kahn-Freund, London: Routledge & Kegan Paul (1949); reprinted in International Library of Sociology (1976; 1996)
  (“The way to realization”, 1929)
  (“At the turning points in two eras: life recollections”), 2 vols.  Vienna: Braumüller 1946

Literary remains (unpublished works):
'  (“Transformations of modern society,” 1947)
  (“100 years of Karl Marx: Heritage and Agenda”; 1947)
  (1950) Vol. 3, Vienna: 1953, reprint European Sociology  1975

See also

 Allied-administered Austria
 National personal autonomy

References

Further reading
 Günter Bischof, Allied Plans and Policies for the Occupation of Austria, 1938–1955, in: Steininger, Rolf et al. (2009). Austria in the Twentieth Century. Transaction Publishers. . pp. 162–189.
 Heinz Fischer, Hugo Pepper (ed.), Karl Renner.  Porträt einer Evolution Lauchringen: Baulino 1984 
 William M. Johnston, Karl Renner: The Austro-Marxist as Conciliator. In: The Austrian Mind: An Intellectual and Social History, 1848–1938 Berkeley: University of California Press, 1983  pp. 105–109
 Ephraim Nimni (ed.),    National cultural autonomy and its contemporary critics. Routledge Innovations in Political Theory,(16 essays) London: Routledge, 2005  
 Stephane Pierre-Caps, "Karl Renner et l'Etat Multinationale: Contribution Juridique á la Solution d'Imbroglios Politiques Contemporains", Droit et Societé 27 (1994), 421–441.
 Ernst Panzenböck, Ein Deutscher Traum: die Anschlussidee und Anschlusspolitik bei Karl Renner und Otto Bauer. Materialien zur Arbeiterbewegung, PhD thesis,  Vienna: Europaverlag, 1985 
Pat Shannon: Review of The Institutions of Private Law and their Social Function In: Journal of Sociology  Vol. 13, No. 3 (1977) p. 264 PDF
 Jamie Bulloch, Karl Renner: Austria London: Haus Publishing, 2009

Notes

External links

 
 

|-

|-

1870 births
1950 deaths
People from Břeclav District
People from the Margraviate of Moravia
Moravian-German people
Austrian Roman Catholics
Social Democratic Party of Austria politicians
Presidents of Austria
Chancellors of Austria
Foreign ministers of Austria
Members of the Austrian House of Deputies (1907–1911)
Members of the Austrian House of Deputies (1911–1918)
Members of the Provisional National Assembly
Members of the Constituent National Assembly (Austria)
Presidents of the National Council (Austria)
20th-century Chancellors of Austria
Cooperative organizers
Austrian magazine founders
Burials at the Vienna Central Cemetery